The 2004 NAIA Division I women's basketball tournament was the tournament held by the NAIA to determine the national champion of women's college basketball among its Division I members in the United States and Canada for the 2003–04 basketball season.

In a rematch of the 2003 final, defending champions Southern Nazarene defeated Oklahoma City in the championship game, 77–61, to claim the Crimson Storm's seventh NAIA national title.

The tournament was played at the Oman Arena in Jackson, Tennessee.

Qualification

The tournament field remained fixed at thirty-two teams, which were sorted into one of four quadrants and seeded from 1 to 8 within each quadrant. 

The tournament continued to utilize a simple single-elimination format.

Bracket

See also
2004 NAIA Division I men's basketball tournament
2004 NCAA Division I women's basketball tournament
2004 NCAA Division II women's basketball tournament
2004 NCAA Division III women's basketball tournament
2004 NAIA Division II women's basketball tournament

References

NAIA
NAIA Women's Basketball Championships
2004 in sports in Tennessee